Dracula 2000: Music from the Dimension Motion Picture is a soundtrack compilation album based on the film Dracula 2000. It was released on 12 December 2000. The soundtrack contains 15 tracks from hard rock and metal artists such as Pantera, Disturbed, Godhead, Marilyn Manson, System of a Down, Linkin Park, Taproot, Hed PE, and Saliva.

Track listing

References

Horror film soundtracks
2000 soundtrack albums
2000s film soundtrack albums
Nu metal albums
Columbia Records soundtracks
Dracula 2000 (film series)